The 26th Filmfare Awards were held in 1979.

Main Tulsi Tere Aangan Ki and Muqaddar Ka Sikandar led the ceremony with 9 nominations each, followed by Satyam Shivam Sundaram and Trishul with 6 nominations each, and Don with 5 nominations.

Don and Main Tulsi Tere Aangan Ki won 3 awards each, thus becoming the most-awarded films at the ceremony, with the former winning Best Actor (for Amitabh Bachchan), and the latter winning Best Film and Best Actress (for Nutan).

The ceremony was notable as Nutan became the first actress in the history of Indian Cinema to win Best Actress 5 times, breaking the record held by Meena Kumari (4 times) for 13 years. She was nominated for both Best Actress and Best Supporting Actress for Main Tulsi Tere Aangan Ki, winning the former. Her niece Kajol matched her record 32 years later, at the 55th Filmfare Awards with her 5th win for My Name Is Khan (2010).

Sanjeev Kumar received dual nominations for Best Actor for his performances in Devata and Pati Patni Aur Woh, but lost to Amitabh Bachchan, who himself received triple nominations in the category for his performances in Don, Muqaddar Ka Sikandar and Trishul, winning for the former.

Main awards

Best Film
 Main Tulsi Tere Aangan Ki 
Ankhiyon Ke Jharokhon Se
Muqaddar Ka Sikandar
Shatranj Ke Khilari
Trishul

Best Director
 Satyajit Ray – Shatranj Ke Khilari 
Prakash Mehra – Muqaddar Ka Sikandar
Raj Kapoor – Satyam Shivam Sundaram
Raj Khosla – Main Tulsi Tere Aangan Ki
Yash Chopra – Trishul

Best Actor
 Amitabh Bachchan – Don 
Amitabh Bachchan – Muqaddar Ka Sikandar
Amitabh Bachchan – Trishul
Sanjeev Kumar – Devata
Sanjeev Kumar – Pati Patni Aur Woh

Best Actress
 Nutan – Main Tulsi Tere Aangan Ki 
Raakhee – Trishna
Ranjeeta – Ankhiyon Ke Jharokhon Se
Rekha – Ghar
Zeenat Aman – Satyam Shivam Sundaram

Best Supporting Actor
 Saeed Jaffrey – Shatranj Ke Khiladi 
Danny Denzongpa – Devata
Randhir Kapoor – Kasme Vaade
Sanjeev Kumar – Trishul
Vinod Khanna – Muqaddar Ka Sikandar

Best Supporting Actress
 Reena Roy – Apnapan 
Asha Parekh – Main Tulsi Tere Aangan Ki
Nutan – Main Tulsi Tere Aangan Ki
Ranjeeta – Pati Patni Aur Woh
Rekha – Muqaddar Ka Sikandar

Best Comic Actor
 Deven Verma – Chor Ke Ghar Chor 
Asrani – Pati Patni Aur Woh
Deven Verma – Khatta Meetha
Keshto Mukherjee – Azaad
Ram Sethi – Muqaddar Ka Sikandar

Best Story
 Ghar – Dinesh Thakur 
Kitaab – Samaresh Basu
Main Tulsi Tere Aangan Ki – Chandrakant Kakodkar
Muqaddar Ka Sikandar – Laxmikant Sharma
Trishul – Salim–Javed

Best Screenplay
 Pati Patni Aur Woh – Kamleshwar

Best Dialogue
 Main Tulsi Tere Aangan Ki – Rahi Masoom Raza

Best Music Director 
 Satyam Shivam Sundaram – Laxmikant–Pyarelal 
Ankhiyon Ke Jharokhon Se – Ravindra Jain
Don – Kalyanji-Anandji
Des Pardes – Rajesh Roshan
Shalimar – R.D. Burman

Best Lyricist
 Apnapan – Anand Bakshi for Aadmi Musafir Hai 
Ankhiyon Ke Jharokhon Se – Ravindra Jain for Ankhiyon Ke Jharokhon Se
Don – Anjaan for Khaike Paan
Main Tulsi Tere Aangan Ki – Anand Bakshi for Main Tulsi Tere Aangan Ki
Satyam Shivam Sundaram – Pandit Narendra Sharma for Satyam Shivam Sundaram

Best Playback Singer, Male
 Don – Kishore Kumar for Khaike Paan 
Apnapan – Mohammad Rafi for Aadmi Musafir Hai
Muqaddar Ka Sikandar – Kishore Kumar for O Saathi Re
Satyam Shivam Sundaram – Mukesh for Chanchal Sheetal
Shalimar – Kishore Kumar for Hum Bewafa

Best Playback Singer, Female
 Don – Asha Bhosle for Yeh Mera Dil 
Ankhiyon Ke Jharokhon Se – Hemlata for Ankhiyon Ke Jharokhon Se
Main Tulsi Tere Aangan Ki – Shobha Gurtu for Saiyyan Rooth Gaye
Muqaddar Ka Sikandar – Asha Bhosle for O Saathi Re
Shalimar – Usha Uthup for One Two Cha Cha Cha

Best Art Direction
 Des Pardes – T. K. Desai

Best Cinematography
 Satyam Shivam Sundaram – Radhu Karmakar

Best Editing
 Badaltey Rishtey – B. Prasad

Best Sound
 Devata – Ranjit Biswas

Critics' awards

Best Film
 Arvind Desai Ki Ajeeb Dastaan

Best Documentary
 Malfunction

Biggest Winners
 Main Tulsi Tere Aangan Ki – 3/9
 Don – 3/5
 Shatranj Ke Khiladi – 2/3
 Apnapan – 2/3
 Satyam Shivam Sundaram – 2/6
Trishul – 0/6
 Muqaddar Ka Sikandar – 0/9

See also
 28th Filmfare Awards
 27th Filmfare Awards
 Filmfare Awards

References

 https://www.imdb.com/event/ev0000245/1979/

Filmfare Awards
Filmfare
1979 in Indian cinema